Being between Scylla and Charybdis is an idiom deriving from Greek mythology, which has been associated with the proverbial advice "to choose the lesser of two evils". Several other idioms, such as "on the horns of a dilemma", "between the devil and the deep blue sea", and "between a rock and a hard place" express similar meanings. The mythical situation also developed a proverbial use in which seeking to choose between equally dangerous extremes is seen as leading inevitably to disaster.

The myth and its proverbial use

Scylla and Charybdis were mythical sea monsters noted by Homer; Greek mythology sited them on opposite sides of the Strait of Messina between Sicily and Calabria, on the Italian mainland. Scylla was rationalized as a rock shoal (described as a six-headed sea monster) on the Calabrian side of the strait and Charybdis was a whirlpool off the coast of Sicily. They were regarded as maritime hazards located close enough to each other that they posed an inescapable threat to passing sailors; avoiding Charybdis meant passing too close to Scylla and vice versa. According to Homer's account, Odysseus was advised to pass by Scylla and lose only a few sailors, rather than risk the loss of his entire ship in the whirlpool.

Because of such stories, the bad result of having to navigate between the two hazards eventually entered proverbial use. Erasmus recorded it in his Adagia (1515) under the Latin form of evitata Charybdi in Scyllam incidi (having escaped Charybdis I fell into Scylla) and also provided a Greek equivalent. After relating the Homeric account and reviewing other connected uses, he went on to explain that the proverb could be applied in three different ways. In circumstances where there is no escape without some cost, the correct course is to "choose the lesser of two evils". Alternatively it may signify that the risks are equally great, whatever one does. A third use is in circumstances where a person has gone too far in avoiding one extreme and has tumbled into its opposite. In this context Erasmus quoted another line that had become proverbial, incidit in Scyllam cupiēns vītāre Charybdem (into Scylla he fell, wishing to avoid Charybdis). This final example was a line from the Alexandreis, a 12th-century Latin epic poem by Walter of Châtillon.

The myth was later given an allegorical interpretation by the French poet Barthélemy Aneau in his emblem book Picta Poesis (1552). There one is advised, much in the spirit of the commentary of Erasmus, that the risk of being envied for wealth or reputation is preferable to being swallowed by the Charybdis of poverty: "Choose the lesser of these evils. A wise man would rather be envied than miserable." Erasmus too had associated the proverb about choosing the lesser of two evils, as well as Walter of Châtillon’s line, with the Classical adage. A later English translation glossed the adage's meaning with a third proverb, that of "falling, as we say, out of the frying pan into the fire, in which form the proverb has been adopted by the French, the Italians and the Spanish." Brewer's Dictionary of Phrase and Fable also treated the English proverb as an established equivalent of the allusion to falling from Scylla into Charybdis.

Cultural references

The story was often applied to political situations at a later date. In James Gillray's cartoon, Britannia between Scylla and Charybdis (3 June 1793), 'William Pitt helms the ship Constitution, containing an alarmed Britannia, between the rock of democracy (with the liberty cap on its summit) and the whirlpool of arbitrary power (in the shape of an inverted crown), to the distant haven of liberty'. This was in the context of the effect of the French Revolution on politics in Britain. That the dilemma had still to be resolved in the aftermath of the revolution is suggested by Percy Bysshe Shelley's returning to the idiom in his 1820 essay A Defence of Poetry: "The rich have become richer, and the poor have become poorer; and the vessel of the state is driven between the Scylla and Charybdis of anarchy and despotism."

A later Punch caricature by John Tenniel, dated 10 October 1863, pictures the prime minister Lord Palmerston carefully steering the British ship of state between the perils of Scylla, a craggy rock in the form of a grim-visaged Abraham Lincoln, and Charybdis, a whirlpool which foams and froths into a likeness of Jefferson Davis. A shield emblazoned "Neutrality" hangs on the ship's thwarts, referring to how Palmerston tried to maintain a strict impartiality towards both combatants in the American Civil War. American satirical magazine Puck also used the myth in a caricature by F. Graetz, dated November 26, 1884, in which the unmarried president-elect Grover Cleveland rows desperately between snarling monsters captioned "Mother-in-law" and "Office Seekers".

Victor Hugo uses the equivalent French idiom (tomber de Charybde en Scylla) in his novel Les Misérables (1862), again in a political context, as a metaphor for the staging of two rebel barricades during the climactic uprising in Paris, around which the final events of the book culminate. The first chapter of the final volume is entitled "The Charybdis of the Faubourg Saint Antoine and the Scylla of the Faubourg du Temple".

By the time of Nicholas Monsarrat's 1951 war novel, The Cruel Sea, however, the upper-class junior officer, Morell, is teased by his middle-class peer, Lockhart, for using such a phrase. Nevertheless, the idiom has since taken on new life in pop lyrics. In The Police's 1983 single "Wrapped Around Your Finger", the second line uses it as a metaphor for being in a dangerous relationship; this is reinforced by a later mention of the similar idiom of "the devil and the deep blue sea". American heavy metal band Trivium also referenced the idiom in "Torn Between Scylla and Charybdis", a track from their 2008 album Shogun, in which the lyrics are about having to choose "between death and doom".

In 2014 Graham Waterhouse composed a piano quartet, Skylla and Charybdis, premiered at the Gasteig in Munich. According to his programme note, though its four movements "do not refer specifically to the protagonists or to events connected with the famous legend", their dynamic is linked subjectively to  images connected with it "conjoured up in the composer's mind during the writing".

See also
Catch-22 (logic)
Dilemma
Hobson's choice
Lesser of two evils principle
Morton's fork
Out of the frying pan into the fire

References

External links
Odyssey in Ancient Greek and translation from Perseus Project, with hyperlinks to grammatical and mythological commentary

Dilemmas
English-language idioms
Phrases and idioms derived from Greek mythology